Wudu is a language spoken in Togo. It is part of a dialect continuum which also includes Ewe and Gen.

References

Gbe languages
Languages of Togo